The 2020 USA Sevens was held in Los Angeles, played at Dignity Health Stadium in Carson in a return to California after a decade in Las Vegas. The rugby sevens tournament was the sixth event of the 2019–20 Sevens World Series for men's teams, and the seventeen edition of the USA Sevens. South Africa won the tournament, defeating Fiji by 29–24 in extra time.

Format
The sixteen are drawn into four pools of four teams. Each team plays every other team in their pool once. The top two teams from each pool advance to the Cup playoffs and compete for gold, silver and bronze medals. The other teams from each pool go to the classification playoffs for ninth to sixteenth placings.

Teams
Fifteen core teams played in the tournament along with one invitational team, South Korea.

Pool stage
All times in Pacific Standard Time (UTC−08:00). The pools were scheduled as follows:

Pool A

Pool B

Pool C

Pool D

Knockout stage

Thirteenth place

Ninth place

Fifth place

Cup

Tournament placings

Players

References

External links
Tournament page 
World Rugby page

2020
USA Sevens 2020
USA Sevens
USA Sevens
USA Sevens
USA Sevens
USA Sevens